Haveli Sangeet is a form of Hindustani classical music sung in havelis. The essential component is dhrupad. It originated in Mathura in Braj, northern India. It takes the form of devotional songs sung daily to Krishna by the Pushtimarg sect.

Under the survey of All India Radio, Government of India it was realized by learned surveyors that the bandish, khayal sung in various gharanas of Hindustani classical music are derived from Haveli Sangeet where they are sung in complete and original form.

Some notable Haveli Sangeet vocalists are:
 Vitthalanatha (c. 1516-1588)
 Harirayji Maharaphu
 Aacharya Dr. Gokulotsavji Maharaj

History
Havelis were places where Hindu deities were installed; due to restrictions on Hindu temples during the Muslim rulers, it was called Haveli Sangeet.

Basically, Haveli Sangeet is another name for Hindu temple music practiced by the followers of Vaishnavism of Nathdwara in Rajasthan, Gujarat, India, and considered a part of a rich historical tradition. Having its origin in Rajasthan and Gujarat, the Haveli music is believed to have an edge over dhrupad (the core of Indian classical music) for the common belief that the music has none other than Lord Krishna himself for an audience. Essentially a tribute to Krishna, its form includes devotional renditions like kirtans, bhajans and bhava nritya, all related to religious worship.  Although a mix of classical and folk music, the style is inherently borrowed from the dhrupad and dhamar. Haveli Sangeet is commonly played at the many temples of India, like the Radha Vallabh of Vrindaban, Krishna of Nandgaon, Uttar Pradesh and Sri Nathji of Nathdwara, to name a few.

With the passage of time, the Haveli Sangeet lost its popularity in India and is almost extinct.

In Gujarat, one school of thought holds that Indian classical music has its origins in the Haveli Sangeet of Vallabha Acharya, a pioneer in this genre. 

The history of Indian classical music has it that the Vaishnav  of Nathdwara were the ones to uphold this sect founded by Vallabh Acharya.

References

Indian styles of music
Hindustani music genres
Hindustani music terminology